The 132nd New York State Legislature, consisting of the New York State Senate and the New York State Assembly, met from January 6 to April 30, 1909, during the third year of Charles Evans Hughes's governorship, in Albany.

Background
Under the provisions of the New York Constitution of 1894, re-apportioned in 1906 and 1907, 51 Senators and 150 assemblymen were elected in single-seat districts; senators for a two-year term, assemblymen for a one-year term. The senatorial districts were made up of entire counties, except New York County (twelve districts), Kings County (eight districts), Erie County (three districts) and Monroe County (two districts). The Assembly districts were made up of contiguous area, all within the same county.

On April 27, 1906, the Legislature re-apportioned the Senate districts, increasing the number to 51. The apportionment was then contested in the courts.

The Legislature also re-apportioned the number of assemblymen per county. Nassau County was separated from the remainder of Queens County; Albany, Broome, Cattaraugus, Cayuga, Onondaga, Oswego and Rensselaer counties lost one seat each; Erie, Monroe and Westchester gained one each; and Kings and Queens counties gained two each.

On April 3, 1907, the new Senate and Assembly apportionment was declared unconstitutional by the New York Court of Appeals.

On July 26, 1907, the Legislature again re-apportioned the Senate districts, and re-enacted the 1906 Assembly apportionment.

At this time there were two major political parties: the Republican Party and the Democratic Party. The Independence League, the Socialist Party, the Prohibition Party and the Socialist Labor Party also nominated tickets.

Elections
The New York state election, 1908, was held on November 3. Gov. Charles Evans Hughes was re-elected; and State Senator Horace White was elected Lieutenant Governor; both Republicans. The other six statewide elective offices up for election were also carried by the Republicans. The approximate party strength at this election, as expressed by the vote for Governor, was: Republican 805,000; Democratic 735,000; Independence League 43,000; Socialists 34,000; Prohibition 19,000; and Socialist Labor 4,000.

Sessions
The Legislature met for the regular session at the State Capitol in Albany on January 6, 1909; and adjourned on April 30.

James Wolcott Wadsworth, Jr. (R) was re-elected Speaker.

John Raines (R) was re-elected President pro tempore of the State Senate.

On January 19, the Legislature elected U.S. Secretary of State Elihu Root (R) to succeed Thomas C. Platt (R) as U.S. Senator from New York for a six-year term beginning on March 4, 1909.

State Senate

Districts

Members
The asterisk (*) denotes members of the previous Legislature who continued in office as members of this Legislature. Orlando Hubbs, Robert F. Wagner, George M. S. Schulz, J. Mayhew Wainwright, George L. Meade and Charles Mann Hamilton changed from the Assembly to the Senate.

Note: For brevity, the chairmanships omit the words "...the Committee on (the)..."

Employees
 Clerk: Lafayette B. Gleason
 Sergeant-at-Arms: Charles R. Hotaling
General Committee Clerk: William S. Coffey

State Assembly

Assemblymen
Note: For brevity, the chairmanships omit the words "...the Committee on (the)..."

Employees
 Clerk: Ray B. Smith
 Sergeant-at-Arms: Bernard J. Haggarty

Notes

Sources
 Official New York from Cleveland to Hughes by Charles Elliott Fitch (Hurd Publishing Co., New York and Buffalo, 1911, Vol. IV; see pg. 356ff for assemblymen; and 366f for senators)
 REPUBLICANS GAIN IN LEGISLATURE in NYT on November 4, 1908
 Manual of Rules and Practice of the Senate (1909)
 REPUBLICAN CAUCUS NAMES WADSWORTH in NYT on January 6, 1909
 COMMITTEES ARE NAMED in NYT on January 14, 1909

132
1909 in New York (state)
1909 U.S. legislative sessions